The Arulmigu Sri Rajakaliamman Glass Temple is a Hindu temple in Johor Bahru, Johor, Malaysia. It is also one of the state's tourist attractions. The temple was listed in the Malaysian Book of Records as the first and only glass temple in the nation on 12 May 2010.

History

The temple, one of Johor Bahru's oldest Hindu temples, is situated next to the railway tracks between Jalan Tun Abdul Razak and Jalan Mohd Taib (or close to the Tebrau Highway). It started in 1922 as a simple shelter on land presented by the Sultan of Johor.

In 1991, Sri Sinnathamby Sivasamy, current temple chairman and chief priest, also known as Guru Bhagawan Sittar inherited the administration of the temple from his father. He is the inspiration and driving force behind the temple. The Guru made a commitment to rebuild the temple upon inheriting it from the humble hut it once was. In spite of difficulties and challenges, the temple was rebuilt and officially reopened in 1996.

Rebuilding in glass
The Guru had the inspiration to rebuild the temple in glass during one of his trips to Bangkok. The driver told him that it was a wat (temple). When he went there, he found that it was the glass artwork at the temple entrance that had caught his eyes.

He was amazed that a small glass artwork could capture his attention from a vast distance. This inspired him to use this technique in the Arulmigu Sri Rajakaliamman Temple. He believed a temple fully embellished with impressive glass artwork will attract local devotees and visitors from the world over.

Transformation of the temple with glass fittings started in 2008 and was completed in October 2009. Since then, it has become one of the state's major tourist attractions.

Architecture

Light from crystal chandeliers is reflected on doors, pillars, walls and ceilings in a bright blaze that is quite blinding initially. At least 90 per cent of the temple is embellished by a mosaic of 300,000 pieces of red, blue, yellow, green, purple and white glass.

The centrepiece in the Athma Lingam sanctuary is a lotus for Shiva, on which devotees can pour rose water and perform their prayers. Guru says this special sanctuary is the first in Malaysia to be designed with walls that are fully covered with 300,000 mukni Rudraksha beads from Nepal.

At a glance, the walls appear to have an unusual embossed texture. Each Rudraksha bead is embedded in the walls with a chanted prayer.

The fully air-conditioned temple has a café that serves vegetarian meals for special events, and a function hall in an adjoining building.

Sculptures
There are 10 gold-finished sculptures close to the ceiling. Of the two figures on the left, one appears to be lying down and the other crawling, while the one on the far right seems to be reclining too. These sculptures portray the cycle of life, from birth, youth, adulthood, to old age and death.

According to the name plaques, these are Gautama Buddha, Guru Nanak Dev Ji, Sai Baba and Mother Teresa. The Guru believes that these are messengers of God, and visitors of other faiths will be happy to see them here.

Murals
On the left wing, there are two large panels on the ceiling painted by specially commissioned artists to convey a universal message of social and racial harmony.

In one picture, a cow is next to an Indian girl, a dog is near a Chinese girl while a Malay girl holds a cat in her arms.

The other picture has a Hindu motorcyclist being helped up by a Muslim after he fell off his bike, while a Buddhist is picking up his helmet and a Christian is lifting up the motorcycle.

Location and Opening Hours
The temple, located in 22 Lorong 1, Jalan Tebrau, Johor Baru, is accessible through Jalan Tun Abdul Razak and the lane that borders Gim Shew Building. Car and coach parking is available and there's also a shoe storage service.

It is open for devotees from 7am to 10pm daily, while visiting hours for tourists are between 1pm and 5pm.

See also
 Kanch Mandir Kach Mandir, Indore, 1903

References

External links

 Visit to the glass temple (with photos)

Buildings and structures in Johor Bahru
Hindu temples in Malaysia
Mariamman temples
Religious buildings and structures in Johor
Tamil diaspora in Malaysia
Tourist attractions in Johor